Santa Venerina (Sicilian: Santa Vinirina) is a comune (municipality) in the Metropolitan City of Catania in the Italian region Sicily, located about  southeast of Palermo and about  northeast of Catania.  

Santa Venerina borders the following municipalities: Acireale, Giarre, Zafferana Etnea.

References

Cities and towns in Sicily